Austin Ardinel Chesterfield "Tom" Clarke,  (July 26, 1934 – June 26, 2016), was a Barbadian novelist, essayist, and short story writer who was based in Toronto, Ontario, Canada. Among his notable books are novels such as The Polished Hoe (2002), memoirs including Membering (2015), and two collections of poetry, Where the Sun Shines Best (2013) and In Your Crib (2015).

Early life and education

Austin Clarke was born in 1934 in St. James, Barbados, where he received his early education in Anglican schools.  He taught at a rural school for three years. In 1955 he moved to Canada and attended the University of Toronto's Trinity College for two years.

Career
Clarke was a reporter at the Timmins Daily Press and the Globe and Mail before joining the Canadian Broadcasting Corporation as a freelance journalist. He subsequently taught at several American universities, including Yale University (Hoyt fellow, 1968–70), Duke University (1971–72), and the University of Texas (visiting professor, 1973) and helped establish black studies programs at several universities.

In 1973 he was designated cultural attaché at the Barbadian embassy in Washington, DC. He was later General Manager of the Caribbean Broadcasting Corporation in Barbados (1975–77). He was writer in residence at Concordia University, Montreal, Quebec (1977), and at the University of Western Ontario (1978). He became a Canadian citizen in 1981. From 1988 to 1993 he served on the Immigration and Refugee Board of Canada.

He was not the first Canadian writer of African origin, that distinction belonging to 19th-Century author Amelia E. Johnson. However, George Elliott Clarke says that Austin Clarke was "the author of African descent in English, in Canada, that anyone who was interested in being a writer would have to be aware of, to challenge as well." In September 2012, at the International Festival of Authors, Clarke was announced as the winner of the $10,000 Harbourfront Festival Prize "on the merits of his published work and efforts in fostering literary talent in new and aspiring writers". Previous recipients of the award (established in 1984) include: Dionne Brand, Wayson Choy, Christopher Dewdney, Helen Humphreys, Paul Quarrington, Peter Robinson, Seth, Jane Urquhart, and Guy Vanderhaeghe. Clarke was reported as saying: "I rejoiced when I saw that Authors at Harbourfront Centre had named me this year's winner of the Harbourfront Festival Prize. I did not come to this city on September 29, 1959, as a writer. I came as a student. However, my career as a writer buried any contention of being a scholar and I thank Authors at Harbourfront Centre for saving me from the more painful life of the 'gradual student.' It is an honour to be part of such a prestigious list of authors."

An outspoken intellectual, he avoided talking about multiculturalism, hoping his own term omniculturalism could be accepted by people from both the political left and right. He ran as a Progressive Conservative candidate in the 1977 Ontario general election.

Clarke died on June 26, 2016, at the age of 81 in Toronto.

Selected awards and honours

1980, Casa de las Américas Prize, Cuba
1992, Toronto Arts Award for Lifetime Achievement in Literature
1997, Lifetime Achievement Award from Frontier College in Toronto
1998, Member of the Order of Canada. 
1999, Martin Luther King Jr. Achievement Award for Excellence in Writing.
1999, W. O. Mitchell Literary Prize
2002, Giller Prize, for The Polished Hoe 
2003, Commonwealth Writers' Prize
2009, Toronto Book Award, for More.
2012, Harbourfront Festival Prize

Bibliography

Novels
The Survivors of the Crossing (Toronto: McClelland & Stewart, 1964)
Amongst Thistles and Thorns (Toronto: McClelland & Stewart, 1965)
The Meeting Point (Toronto: Macmillan, 1967; Boston: Little, Brown, 1972)
Storm of Fortune (Boston: Little, Brown, 1973)
The Bigger Light (Boston: Little, Brown, 1975)
The Prime Minister (Don Mills, Ont.: General Publishing, 1977)
Proud Empires (London: Gollancz, 1986; Penguin-Viking, 1988)
The Origin of Waves (McClelland & Stewart, 1997; winner of the Rogers Writers' Trust Fiction Prize)
The Question (Toronto: McClelland & Stewart, 1999; nominated for a Governor General's Award)
The Polished Hoe (Toronto: Thomas Allen, 2002; winner of the Giller Prize and the Commonwealth Writers' Prize)
More (2008, winner of the City of Toronto Book Award)

Short story collections
When He Was Free and Young and He Used to Wear Silks (Toronto: Anansi, 1971; revised edition Little, Brown, 1973)
When Women Rule (Toronto: McClelland & Stewart, 1985)
Nine Men Who Laughed (Toronto: McClelland & Stewart, 1986)
In This City (Toronto: Exile Editions, 1992)
There Are No Elders (Toronto: Exile Editions, 1993)
The Austin Clarke Reader, ed. Barry Callaghan (Toronto: Exile Editions, 1996)
Choosing His Coffin: The Best Stories of Austin Clarke (Toronto: Thomas Allen, 2003)
They Never Told Me: and Other Stories (Holstein, ON: Exile Editions, 2013)
Canadian Experience (Toronto: Exile Editions, 1994)

Poetry
Where the Sun Shines Best (Toronto: Guernica Editions, 2013)
In Your Crib (Toronto: Guernica Editions, 2015)

Memoirs
Growing Up Stupid Under the Union Jack: a Memoir (Toronto: McClelland & Stewart, 1980; Thomas Allen, 2005)
"A Stranger In A Strange Land", The Globe and Mail, Toronto, 15 August 1990, p. 30.
Public Enemies: Police Violence and Black Youth (Toronto: HarperCollins, 1992)
A Passage Back Home: A Personal Reminiscence of Samuel Selvon (Toronto: Exile Editions, 1994)
Pigtails 'n Breadfruit: A Culinary Memoir (New Press, 1999); as Pigtails 'n' Breadfruit: The Rituals of Slave Food, A Barbadian Memoir (Toronto: Random House, 1999; University of Toronto Press, 2001); Pig Tails 'n' Breadfruit - Anniversary Edition (Ian Randle Publishers, 2014)
Love and Sweet Food: A Culinary Memoir (Toronto: Thomas Allen, 2004)
′Membering (Toronto: Dundurn Press, 2015)

References

External links
Austin Clarke interview by Linda Richards, January magazine, November 2002.
Famous Canadian Immigrant Authors
Austin Clarke's entry in The Canadian Encyclopedia

"Austin Clarke", English-Canadian Writers, Athabasca University.
Carol Brennan, "Austin C. Clarke", Gale Contemporary Black Biography.

1934 births
2016 deaths
Barbadian emigrants to Canada
Black Canadian writers
Canadian male novelists
Canadian male short story writers
Members of the Order of Canada
Members of the Order of Ontario
Naturalized citizens of Canada
Writers from Toronto
University of Toronto alumni
Barbadian novelists
Barbadian male writers
20th-century Canadian novelists
21st-century Canadian novelists
20th-century Canadian short story writers
21st-century Canadian short story writers
Academic staff of Concordia University
20th-century Canadian male writers
21st-century Canadian male writers
Barbadian poets
Progressive Conservative Party of Ontario candidates in Ontario provincial elections